The Canadian Beef Check-Off Agency (CBCA), called the Canadian Beef Cattle Research, Market Development and Promotion Agency until 2017, operates the Canadian Beef Cattle Check-Off (CBCC).

Synopsis

The agency is funded by a levy on Canadian cattle sales to support research and marketing of beef products. Its activities are supervised by the Farm Products Council of Canada. It is governed by a geographically-representative 16-member Board of Directors.

The CBCA funds bodies like Canada Beef and the Beef Cattle Research Council (BCRC). The BCRC listed the agency as one of the "Industry Stakeholders Represented at the BCRC Workshops" in the Canadian Beef Research and Technology Transfer Strategy 2018 - 2023 document.

A March 2015 article about the Canadian Beef Centre of Excellence noted the agency had incorporated the Beef Information Centre (BIC) and Canada Beef Export Federation (CBEF) into one big organization and its given that thing the name Canada Beef.

The CBCA's AGM business is hosted at the annual Canadian Beef Industry Conference, which was inaugurated in 2016 when both Rachel Notley and Justin Trudeau were in power. The 2018 CBIC was held in London, Ontario.

Cattlemen have paid the CBCC levy of $2.50 per head since April 2012. It is payable by producers who feed, slaughter and sell their own cattle.  The CBCA flows from the Farm Products Agencies Act (R.S. 1985, c. F-4) through SOR/2002-48.

Leadership

2017
 Jeff Smith (Alberta)
 Doug Sawyer (Alberta)
 Linda Allison (British Columbia) chair
 Heinz Reimer (Manitoba) vice-chair

2018
Heinz Reimer took over the chair in 2018. The change in leadership included Chad Ross of Saskatchewan as vice-chair, Larry Weatherby of Nova Scotia as governance chair, and Lonnie Lake as finance chair.

See also
 Canadian import duties
 List of food industry trade associations

References

Food industry trade groups
Beef
Trade associations based in Canada
Cattle
Agriculture and Agri-Food Canada
Agriculture in Canada
Foreign trade of Canada
Commodity checkoff programs